Anthidiellum notatum, the northern rotund resin bee, is a species of bee in the family Megachilidae. It is found in North America.

Subspecies
These five subspecies belong to the species Anthidiellum notatum:
 Anthidiellum notatum boreale (Robertson, 1902)
 Anthidiellum notatum gilense (Cockerell, 1897)
 Anthidiellum notatum notatum (Latreille, 1809)
 Anthidiellum notatum robertsoni (Cockerell, 1904)
 Anthidiellum notatum rufimaculatum Schwarz, 1926

References

Further reading

External links

 

Megachilidae
Articles created by Qbugbot
Insects described in 1809